Like Dandelion Dust is a 2009 drama film directed by Jon Gunn and based on the novel by the same name by Karen Kingsbury. The film won 26 awards at 23 film festivals.

Plot 
Two police officers knock on the door of a home and a drunk man answers. Rip Porter lives at the house with his wife Wendy. The police say they are checking on an emergency call 
and find Rip drunk and Wendy injured. They arrest Rip, and he is sent to prison.

Seven years later, Rip is released from prison. Rip has changed; he is now sober and has taken anger management courses. When Rip suggests starting a family, Wendy feels forced to reveal that she gave birth to their son while he was in prison but gave the baby up for adoption to the Campbells who live in Florida. Rip immediately wants custody of his son, and has a right to do so because Wendy forged his signature on the adoption papers. Jack and Molly Campbell have enjoyed an idyllic life with Joey, Wendy and Rip's son. When a judge upholds Rip and Wendy's claim, Molly and Jack are distraught. Joey's first visit with Wendy and Rip goes exceptionally well.

As a last resort, Jack travels to Ohio and offers Rip money in exchange for Joey. Rip refuses, and gets in a physical altercation with Jack. Since this confrontation, Rip starts drinking again due to stress. On the next visit when Joey refuses to take a shower, Rip is at first patient but eventually loses his temper. He roughly puts Joey in the shower, and unintentionally leaves a bruise on Joey's arm. Before Joey leaves, Wendy tells him about making a wish by blowing on a dandelion. Once he is gone, Wendy tells Rip that she arranged for Joey to spend an extra week with Jack and Molly. This upsets Rip and he seriously assaults Wendy.

When Joey returns home, he shows his bruise to Jack and Molly and tells them what happened. Molly convinces Jack they should flee the country with Joey. They join a church mission trip to Haiti, with Molly's sister and her husband. Jack has arranged for the three of them to fly out to another country. However, Molly's sister is suspicious and calls Allyson Bower, the child services agent in charge of Joey's case. The Campbells are returned to the US where they meet with Allyson Bower and Wendy. A regretful Rip agrees to receive help and guidance for his alcoholism and anger problems in the hope of becoming a better man. Wendy tells the Campbells that Rip never meant to hurt Joey, but that he is not ready to be a father. Jack apologizes to her for trying to bribe Rip. Ultimately, Wendy agrees to hand Joey over to them permanently and signs a revised adoption paper with Rip's signature. As Wendy bids Joey goodbye, she expresses her hopes that she and Rip can have a relationship with him when he grows older.

Cast 

Mira Sorvino as Wendy Porter
Barry Pepper as Rip Porter
Cole Hauser as Jack Campbell
Kate Levering as Molly Campbell
Maxwell Perry Cotton as Joey Campbell
L. Scott Caldwell as Allyson Bower
Abby Brammell as Beth Norton

Release 
The film was released in the United States September 23, 2010. The Times-Colonist named it as one of "10 films you will want to watch" at the Victoria Film Festival.

The film was relatively successful, earning $77,960 on its opening weekend, in just 25 theaters. It was then expanded to 60 theaters, and by the end of its run, earned a domestic total of $352,810.

Reception 
The film was well received by critics. On Rotten Tomatoes, 80% of critics gave the film a positive review, based on 15 reviews. Michael Ordona of the Los Angeles Times remarked, "'Like Dandelion Dust' is a well-acted, earnest film about adoptive parents' worst nightmare, dealing sympathetically with all parties in a lose-lose situation." Neil Genzlinger of The New York Times praised the film and said, "There's no denying that the acting in Like Dandelion Dust, an adoption drama directed by Jon Gunn from a novel by Karen Kingsbury, is superb."

Awards 

Deauville Film Festival

2009  Won "Première" Award Feature Film:
Bobby Downes

Heartland Film Festival

2009  Won Audience Award Best Dramatic Feature:
Bobby Downes,
Kevin Downes,
Kerry David,
Jon Gunn

Las Vegas International Film Festival

2009  Won Grand Jury Prize Best Feature:

Best Feature:
Bobby Downes,
Kevin Downes,
Kerry David

Jury Prize Best Actor:
Barry Pepper

New York VisionFest

2009  Won Film Competition Award Acting (Female Lead):
Mira Sorvino

Acting (Male Lead):
Barry Pepper

Production:
Bobby Downes,
Kevin Downes,
Kerry David

Writing:
Michael Lachance,
Stephen J. Rivele

San Diego Film Festival

2009  Won Festival Award Best Actress:
Mira Sorvino

San Luis Obispo International Film Festival

2009  Won George Sidney Independent Film Competition - Special Jury Prize Best Feature:
Jon Gunn,
Kerry David,
Kevin Downes,
Bobby Downes

Sedona International Film Festival 

2009  Won Audience Award Best Feature:
Kerry David,
Jon Gunn,
Kevin Downes,
Bobby Downes

Best Feature:
Bobby Downes,
Kevin Downes,
Kerry David

Sonoma Valley Film Festival

2009  Won Audience Award Best Picture:
Kevin Downes,
Bobby Downes,
Kerry David,
Jon Gunn

Honorable Mention Best Actor:
Maxwell Perry Cotton

Jury Award Best Actress:
Mira Sorvino

Best Narrative Feature:
Bobby Downes,
Kevin Downes,
Kerry David

Stony Brook Film Festival

2009  Won Audience Choice Award Best Feature:
Kerry David,
Kevin Downes,
Bobby Downes

Vail Film Festival

2009  Won Audience Award Best Feature:
Kevin Downes,
Bobby Downes,
Kerry David,
Jon Gunn

See also

References

External links 
 
 

2009 films
2009 drama films
American drama films
American independent films
Films about adoption
Films about domestic violence
Films about Christianity
Films about religion
Films based on American novels
Films set in Ohio
Films shot in Jacksonville, Florida
Films produced by Kevin Downes
Films produced by Bobby Downes
Films directed by Jon Gunn
2000s English-language films
2000s American films